Conrad Hermann Hubertus Maria Apollinaris Josten (7 June 1912 in Neuss, Germany – 10 July 1994 in Neuss), known as Kurt Josten or C. H. Josten, was a historian of science and Curator of the Museum of the History of Science, Oxford in England.

In 1921 to 1929, Josten was educated by the Jesuits at Bad Godesberg in Germany. He studied for a year at the Staatliches Gymnasium in Neuss, followed by studies at the University of Geneva,  University of Freiburg, and  University of Bonn. In 1934 Josten worked in the office of the then Vice-Chancellor Franz von Papen, where he was involved in conservative plots to use the extensive powers of the aging President von Hindenburg - in particular his supreme command over the army - in order to stymie a complete grab of power by the Nazi members of the Government. When those aspirations came to a bloody end during the occupation of the Papen-Offices by the SS during the Night of the Long Knives on 30 June 1934, Josten scarcely managed to escape while his immediate superior Herbert von Bose was shot and other members of the Papen staff were arrested and taken to Lichtenburg Concentration Camp.

In 1935 Josten achieved a doctorate in law from the, University of Erlangen. However, he gave up law due to disillusionment about the state of law in Germany under the Nazis. Also in 1935, he visited England, including Oxford.

Jostem opposed Nazism from 1934 onwards and went into hiding in 1943 in Paris, France and then Bavaria in Germany.  After World War II, he returned to England and eventually became a naturalized British citizen in 1954.

In 1949, Josten achieved a major scholarly success while working at the Bodleian Library, Oxford University's main library. He discovered the code used by Elias Ashmole (the founder of the Ashmolean Museum at Oxford) to encrypt his diaries. The decoded material was eventually published in 1966.

Josten became Curator of the Museum of the History of Science at Oxford in 1950. He was an expert on the early history of chemistry (alchemy), astronomy, and early astronomical instruments. He expanded the museum's collection through purchases and the major gift of the private collection of the shipping owner, Jack Billmeir. This consisted of astronomical and mathematical instruments. It was built up with the help of Josten.

On his early retirement in 1964 at the age of 52, he took an emeritus curatorial position at the museum. He encouraged his successor, Francis Maddison, who was previously an assistant curator at the museum.

Kurt Josen was a member of Brasenose College, Oxford (also the college of Elias Ashmole) and a Fellow of the Society of Antiquaries.
He lived in rooms in St John Street in central Oxford. Josten married Constanze Josten in 1962. She died in 1968.

Works 
  Elias Ashmole (1617-1692): his autobiographical and historical notes, his correspondence, and other contemporary sources relating to his life and work, 5 volumes (Oxford, 1966).

References 

1912 births
1994 deaths
People from Neuss
University of Geneva alumni
University of Freiburg alumni
University of Bonn alumni
University of Erlangen-Nuremberg alumni
German curators
20th-century German historians
British curators
Historians of science
German emigrants to England
Fellows of Brasenose College, Oxford
Fellows of the Society of Antiquaries of London
Directors of museums in the United Kingdom
German male non-fiction writers
20th-century English historians
Naturalised citizens of the United Kingdom